Cryptotaenia elegans, Spanish: perejil de Monteverde (parsley of Monteverde), is a plant species in the genus Cryptotaenia endemic to the Canary Islands.

References

Apioideae
Endemic flora of the Canary Islands
Plants described in 1861